Mircea Dridea (born 7 April 1937) is a Romanian former football player and manager.

Club career

Mircea Dridea was born on 7 April 1937 in Ploiești and at age 15 he was a category one chess player, being brought by his brother Virgil to play football in 1952 at the junior squads of Petrolul Ploiești where his first coach was Emil Avasilichioaie, in 1954 he worked with Manole Rădulescu and in 1955 Traian Ionescu came to the club and formed a generation of juniors which included Dridea, Constantin Tabarcea and Vasile Sfetcu which reached the national junior championship final which was lost in front of Universitatea Cluj. He made his debut for the senior team under coach Ilie Oană in October 1956 in a 2–1 away victory against Rapid București. He won two consecutive Divizia A titles in the 1957–58 and 1958–59 seasons, being used by Oană in 11 matches in which he scored 4 goals in the first one and in the second appearing in 18 games in which he scored 14 goals, being the top-goalscorer of the team. Dridea scored a hat-trick in the 6–1 victory against Siderurgistul Galați from the 1963 Cupa României Final and won another championship in the 1965–66 season, being used by coach Constantin Cernăianu in 25 games in which he scored 11 goals. He also did some notable performances in European competitions, scoring Petrolul's first two goals in the European Cup in a 4–2 loss against Wismut Karl Marx Stadt, first goal in the UEFA Cup Winners' Cup in a 4–1 loss against Fenerbahçe and first goal in the Inter-Cities Fairs Cup against Spartak Brno, but his most important goal scored was in the first round of the 1966–67 European Cup against Liverpool from a free kick in a 3–1 victory, however the team did not manage to qualify to the next round. Mircea Dridea made his last Divizia A appearance on 20 June 1971 in a 1–1 against CFR Timișoara, having a total of 273 matches with 142 goals scored in the competition, also having a total of 21 games with 10 goals scored in European competitions (including 10 appearances and 5 goals scored in the Inter-Cities Fairs Cup).

International career
Mircea Dridea played 15 games in which he scored 8 goals at international level for Romania, making his debut under coach Augustin Botescu on 30 August 1959 in a friendly which ended with a 3–2 away victory against Poland in which he scored a hat-trick. He played in a 2–0 home victory against Portugal at the 1966 World Cup qualifiers after which opponent Eusébio said that he considered Dridea the man of the match. He also played four games at the Euro 1968 qualifiers with one goal scored in a 4–2 home victory against Switzerland and a double scored in a 5–1 victory against Cyprus.

International goals
Scores and results list Romania's goal tally first. "Score" column indicates the score after each Mircea Dridea goal.

Managerial career
Mircea Dridea started his career as coach at a junior squad of Petrolul Ploiești, winning a national junior title. He started the 1973–74 Divizia A season as an assistant of Gheorghe Dumitrescu at Petrolul, but after finishing the first half of the season on the 16th position, Dumitrescu left the club and Dridea became the head coach of the team in the second half, however he could not save the team from relegating to Divizia B. He coached Petrolul Teleajen in Divizia C for almost two years, being close to promote it to Divizia B. He returned at Petrolul to lead them in the 1981–82 Divizia B season, helping the club promote to Divizia A. In the winter of 1983 the Moroccan Football Federation asked the Romanian Football Federation to send them four coaches, one of them being Dridea who went to coach FAR Rabat, taking the team from a modest place in the league and taking it to the first place, leaving the club at the beginning of 1984. He came back to Romania, working at Divizia B club, Prahova Ploiești which he helped avoid relegation. He returned for a third spell as coach at Petrolul after Petre Dragomir left the team after the first six games of the 1985–86 Divizia A, leading the team for two seasons. Dridea went to coach for a second spell in Morocco at Kénitra, afterwards returning to Romania at Progresul Brăila. He coached in the first half of the 1988–89 Divizia A season at Sportul Studențesc București, coaching in the second half at Oțelul Galați. In the following years he coached in the Romanian lower leagues at Flacăra Moreni, Metalul Plopeni which he helped promote to Divizia B and Metalul Filipeștii de Pădure with whom he earned a promotion to Divizia C after winning a play-off against Foresta Nehoiu, also having a spell in Egypt at Olympic Alexandria and ended his coaching career in Tunisia at Olympique de Médenine in 1997. Mircea Dridea has a total of 121 matches as a manager in the Romanian top-division, Divizia A consisting of 37 victories, 33 draws and 51 losses, also he worked as Petrolul's president on three occasions.

Personal life
Mircea Dridea's brother, Virgil was also a footballer and a manager, they played together at Petrolul Ploiești, winning two Divizia A titles together and were opponents as managers in the 1981–82 Divizia B season when Mircea coached Petrolul and Virgil coached Metalul Plopeni.

Honours

Player
Petrolul Ploiești
Divizia A: 1957–58, 1958–59, 1965–66
Cupa României: 1962–63

Manager
Petrolul Ploiești
Divizia B: 1981–82
FAR Rabat
Botola: 1983–84
Metalul Plopeni
Divizia C: 1992–93

Notes

See also
List of one-club men

References

External links

1937 births
Living people
Sportspeople from Ploiești
Romanian footballers
Romania international footballers
Association football forwards
Liga I players
FC Petrolul Ploiești players
Romanian football managers
FC Petrolul Ploiești managers
KAC Kénitra managers
AFC Dacia Unirea Brăila managers
FC Sportul Studențesc București managers
ASC Oțelul Galați managers
CSM Flacăra Moreni managers
AS FAR (football) managers
CSO Plopeni managers
Romanian expatriate football managers
Romanian expatriate sportspeople in Morocco
Expatriate football managers in Morocco
Romanian expatriate sportspeople in Egypt
Expatriate football managers in Egypt
Romanian expatriate sportspeople in Tunisia
Expatriate football managers in Tunisia
Romanian sports executives and administrators